Adama Soumaré (born 12 May 1982) is a retired French-Burundian defender who played as a defender.

Career
Soumaré began his career 2000 with Le Havre AC and was loaned out to Vannes on 7 January 2009.

Personal life
Adama is the younger brother of Abdoulaye Soumaré and the elder brother of Elhadji Yaya Soumaré, who plays in the CFA from Le Havre AC.

References

External links

1982 births
Living people
French people of Burundian descent
Association football defenders
French footballers
Le Havre AC players
Vannes OC players
AS Cannes players